Douglas J. La Follette (born June 6, 1940) is an American academic, environmental scientist, and politician who served as the 30th Secretary of State of Wisconsin from 1983 to 2023. He is a member of the Democratic Party. At the time of his retirement, La Follette was the longest-serving statewide elected official (excluding U.S. senators) in the United States; he was narrowly re-elected in 2022 to an unprecedented 12th term in office, but retired shortly after the start of the new term. He previously served as the 28th Secretary of State from 1975 to 1979, and in the Wisconsin Senate from 1973 to 1975.

Early life and career
A member of the prominent Wisconsin La Follette family, La Follette was born in Des Moines, Iowa. He received his Bachelor of Arts degree from Marietta College, his Master of Science in chemistry from Stanford University, and his Ph.D. in organic chemistry from Columbia University. He began a teaching career as an assistant professor at University of Wisconsin–Parkside in Kenosha. La Follette also served as a research associate at University of Wisconsin–Madison. He also owned a small business.

Known as an environmentalist before running for public office, he was a Wisconsin organizer of the first Earth Day for Gaylord Nelson in 1970 and co-founded Wisconsin's Environmental Decade (now known as Clean Wisconsin) with Peter Anderson.

His great-grandfather has been described as an uncle of Robert "Fighting Bob" La Follette by the Milwaukee Journal Sentinel and Chemical & Engineering News, while Dissent Magazine referred to the great-grandfather as Robert La Follette's brother. WKOW News and WEAU News state that Robert La Follette was Doug's great-uncle. Robert's grandson, former Wisconsin Attorney General Bronson La Follette, has described Doug La Follette as a "second cousin, three times removed" from Robert La Follette. Alternatively, Milwaukee Magazine has noted Doug as a first cousin three times removed of Robert La Follette. According to professor and author Nancy Unger, Doug is a third cousin of Bronson. Doug went on to serve with Bronson from 1975 to 1979 and from 1983 to 1987.

Political career
La Follette first ran for office in the 1970 U.S. House of Representatives election, losing to Les Aspin in the Democratic primary for Wisconsin's 1st congressional district. La Follette served in the Wisconsin State Senate for Kenosha in 1973 and 1974.

La Follette was elected Secretary of State of Wisconsin in 1974. He unsuccessfully ran for Lieutenant Governor of Wisconsin on a ticket with Governor Martin Schreiber in 1978. In 1982, he was again elected Secretary of State, defeating incumbent Vel Phillips. La Follette has been the Secretary of State of Wisconsin ever since.

He has run opposed and unopposed several times for Secretary of State and shuns fundraising in the style of former Wisconsin Senator William Proxmire. In 1990, his opponent, Madison attorney and radio personality Stuart Levitan, campaigned on a promise to eliminate the Secretary of State's office, whose duties have been reduced and transferred to other agencies (including the State Board of Elections) by the state legislature, under La Follette's tenure.

Since being elected Secretary of State, La Follette has run twice for federal office. In 1988, he ran for the U.S. Senate, losing the primary to Herb Kohl. In 1996, he made another bid for the U.S. House of Representatives, losing in the Democratic primary for Wisconsin's 1st congressional district to Lydia Spottswood, who went on to lose the general election to Mark Neumann.

In 2012, La Follette ran in the Democratic primary in the special election to recall Scott Walker.

In 2023, La Follette resigned as Secretary of State. Governor Tony Evers appointed former State Treasurer Sarah Godlewski to the position. At the time of his retirement, La Follette was the earliest serving non-federal statewide elected official in the United States holding the same office, having served from January 3, 1983 to March 17, 2023.

Other roles
 La Follette is the author of the 1991 book The Survival Handbook: A Strategy for Saving Planet Earth.
 He has also served on the board of directors of Friends of the Earth and the Union of Concerned Scientists.
 In 2003 he ran for, and was elected to, the board of directors of the Sierra Club for a three-year term. He did not seek reelection in 2006.
 He was a Fulbright Distinguished American Scholar in 2003.

Electoral history

U.S. House (1970)

| colspan="6" style="text-align:center;background-color: #e9e9e9;"| Democratic Primary, September 8, 1970

Wisconsin Senate (1972)

| colspan="6" style="text-align:center;background-color: #e9e9e9;"| Democratic Primary, September 12, 1972

| colspan="6" style="text-align:center;background-color: #e9e9e9;"| General Election, November 7, 1972

Wisconsin Secretary of State (1974)

| colspan="6" style="text-align:center;background-color: #e9e9e9;"| Democratic Primary, September 10, 1974

| colspan="6" style="text-align:center;background-color: #e9e9e9;"| General Election, November 5, 1974

Wisconsin Lieutenant Governor (1978)

| colspan="6" style="text-align:center;background-color: #e9e9e9;"| Democratic Lieutenant Governor Primary, September 12, 1978

| colspan="6" style="text-align:center;background-color: #e9e9e9;"| General Election, November 7, 1978

Wisconsin Secretary of State (1982, 1986, 1990, 1994)

U.S. House (1996)

| colspan="6" style="text-align:center;background-color: #e9e9e9;"| Democratic Primary, September 10, 1996

Wisconsin Secretary of State (1998–2023)

References

External links

Office of the Wisconsin Secretary of State (Archived March 16, 2023)
Clean Wisconsin

|-

|-

|-

|-

|-

1940 births
Living people
20th-century American politicians
21st-century American politicians
American environmentalists
Businesspeople from Wisconsin
Columbia Graduate School of Arts and Sciences alumni
Democratic Party Wisconsin state senators
La Follette family
Marietta College alumni
Politicians from Des Moines, Iowa
Politicians from Kenosha, Wisconsin
Secretaries of State of Wisconsin
Sierra Club directors
Stanford University alumni
University of Wisconsin–Madison fellows
University of Wisconsin–Parkside faculty
Writers from Des Moines, Iowa
Writers from Wisconsin